"Turnin' Me On" is the second single from duo Nina Sky's debut album. It was written by Nicole Albino, Natalie Albino, David Shayman (Disco D), Cipha Sounds and Dwayne Chin-Quee (Supa Dups). The song uses Black Chiney's Kopa riddim. The single was released on 30 November 2004 for digital download and CD. It was released as the second and final single from their self-titled debut album. It was a minor hit in France and the United States, failing to chart on the US Billboard Hot 100. "Turnin' Me On" served as the final release by Nina Sky through Universal Records, before the label got defunct in 2005 and the duo moved to Polo Grounds Music.

Background and recording
It was written by Nicole and Natalie Albino, David Shayman, Luis Diaz and Dwayne Chin-Quee and produced by Disco D, Cipha Sounds, Supa Dups and M. "Khan" Chin. It was recorded between 2003 and 2004 in various studios located in New York City and Miami. Majority of the track was worked with Black Chiney and recorded in their studios in Miami. "Turnin' Me On" speaks about a girl who gets attracted to a boy.

Recording locations

New York City
The Hit Factory
Sterling Sound Studios
Mirror Image Studios
The Booty Barn Studios

Miami
Al Burna Studios
Black Chiney Studios
The Boxx Studios

Commercial performance
"Turnin' Me On" was a moderate success and didn't repeat the success of "Move Ya Body", failing to enter the US Billboard Hot 100. It peaked at number five on the US Bubbling Under Hot 100. It was also a minor top 40 hit in France, where it peaked at number forty. It also peaked at number seventy-four on the Hot R&B/Hip-Hop Songs and number thirty-three on the US Billboard Rhythmic Top 40. It failed to chart anywhere but France and the United States and charted between 2004 and 2007.

Track listing
Promo CD single
"Turnin' Me On" (Album version)
"Turnin' Me On" (Cipha Sounds mix)
"Turnin' Me On" (Black Chiney reggae remix)
"Turnin' Me On" (Instrumental version)
"Call Out Hook"

CD single
"Turnin' Me On" (Full Phatt Remix)
"Turnin' Me On" (Album version)

Vinyl 12"
A-side
"Turnin' Me On" (Cipha Sounds radio edit)
"Turnin' Me On" (Radio edit)
B-side
"Turnin' Me On" (Black Chiney reggae radio edit)
"Turnin' Me On" (Instrumental)

Vinyl 7"
"Turnin' Me On" (45' mix)
"Turnin' Me On" (Dancehall mix) (featuring Baby Cham)

2007 Jamaica edition
"Turnin' Me On" (Radio mix)
"Turnin' Me On" (Dancehall mix)

Remixes
Three remixes were released for the song.
One remix features Cham, in which its featured on the Kopa riddim compilation album.
Another remix features Shawnna and Pitbull, in which it is featured on Pitbull's remix album Money Is Still a Major Issue.
Third remix was Kassanova remix. It was released on October 21, 2005 on their mixtape album La Conexión.
Fourth remix was exclusively for the second episode of Kerwin Frost's radio show exclusively on Apple Music paying homage to the entertainer on the song. It was premiered on May 25, 2020.

Charts

Awards and nominations

Release history

References

External links
 Official website

Nina Sky songs
2004 singles
2004 songs
Songs written by Supa Dups